Andrew Jukes (1847 – 28 April 1931) was a Canadian Anglican missionary and doctor. He translated the Four Gospels into the Jatki dialect of Punjabi, as well as producing a prominent bilingual dictionary of the language.

Biography
Jukes was born in Canada, educated at Blundell's School and went on to receive his education as a doctor in Britain. In 1878 he was appointed as a medical missionary by one of the principal missionary organization of the Church of England, the Church Missionary Society (C.M.S). He was attached to society's Punjab and Sindh mission, which covered virtually all of present-day Pakistan. He was sent to Baloch mission at Dera Ghazi Khan where he stayed until 1906.

Work
Jukes' main work was the translation of the Bible into the local language. Here Jukes was fortunate in his assistant, Muhammad Hassan S /O Sher Muhammad. Jukes acknowledged his services on many occasions. Jukes continued his work both at the translation of books of the Bible and at the task of a full bilingual dictionary.

In 1898 the translation of the four Gospels were completed. Jukes's dictionary of the Jatki Punjabi language contains more than ten thousand entries.

With the financial help of the Government of India, Jukes' Siraiki-English dictionary was published in 1900, but his English-Siraiki dictionary could not be published and the manuscript appears to be lost.

Related missionaries
Jukes's brother, Worthington Jukes (1849–1937) was also a CMS Missionary in Amritsar, Punjab, North India (1872–74) and Peshawar (1874–1890). His elder brother Mark Jukes (1842–1932) spent fourteen years in missionary work at Emerson, Manitoba.  Six of his nephews and nieces, children of his sister Marianne Jukes (1846–1915) and her husband James Watney (1836–1891), were also missionaries in Africa, India, China, and the Middle East.

Bibliography
 Dictionary of Jatki or Western Punjabi Language

References

Further reading
Reminiscences of missionary work in Amritsar 1872-1873 and on the Afghan frontier in Peshawar 1873-1890; The Rev. Worthington Jukes, 1925, Transcribed by Wayne Kempton; Episcopal Diocese of New York, 2007

Canadian Anglican missionaries
1847 births
1931 deaths
People educated at Blundell's School
Bible translators
Anglican biblical scholars
Canadian biblical scholars
British biblical scholars
Anglican missionaries in India
Christian medical missionaries
Missionary linguists
Church Mission Society missionaries
Translators of the Bible into Punjabi